Hello My Beautiful World is the fourth studio album by indie rock band Holy Holy, released on 20 August 2021. The album debuted at number 4 on the ARIA Albums Chart and is their highest ARIA chart peak.

At the 2021 ARIA Music Awards, the album was nominated for Best Rock Album.

At the J Awards of 2021, the album was nominated for Australian Album of the Year.

Critical reception

Dylan Marshall from The AU Review said "Whilst not the perfect album, Hello My Beautiful World forges Holy Holy place as one of Australia's best and most consistent bands. Known for their live shows just as much as for their albums, Hello My Beautiful World leaves Holy Holy incredibly well placed to continuing cementing their place in the upper echelons of the Australian music landscape. Their ability to meld a variety of genres and styles together is a testament to their abilities as musicians and as a band. Hello My Beautiful World is their best album yet."

Jake Cleland from Stack Magazine called it "grounded but epic" and "a tremendous package".

Tyler Jenke from Rolling Stone Australia said "At its core, Hello My Beautiful World is a record seemingly created, whether intentionally or not, to feel like an escape. The way in which they allow tracks to flow on, to evolve, and to truly take form with the codas of 'The Aftergone', 'I.C.U.' and 'So Tired' evokes memories of a concept album of sorts, breaking free of traditional song-by-song track listing, escaping its confines, and instead feeling like a grander art piece." Jenke concluded saying "Expansive, cinematic, rhythmic and truly immersive, Holy Holy at no point show any signs of a global pandemic having hindered their creative process on Hello My Beautiful World and instead provide a mesmerising escape from the drudgery of modern life, while focusing on the beautiful moments that we've missed."

Cyclone Wehner from NME Australia wrote that "Hello is a meditative yet uplifting album that fosters calm and collectivity in response to pandemic existentialism." adding "The album's zenith is the empathetic overture 'Stand Where I'm Standing'".

Track listing

Charts

Release history

References

2021 albums
Holy Holy (Australian band) albums
Sony Music Australia albums
Wonderlick Entertainment albums